Many people, including drivers, crew members, officials and spectators, have been killed in crashes related to the sport of auto racing, in races, in qualifying, in practice or in private testing sessions. Deaths among racers and spectators were numerous in the early years of racing, but advances in safety technology, and specifications designed by sanctioning bodies to limit speeds, have reduced the rate of fatal accidents. Major accidents have often spurred increased safety measures and rules changes. Widely considered to be the worst accident is the 1955 Le Mans disaster at 24 Hours of Le Mans that killed driver Pierre Levegh and approximately 80 spectators with over 100 being injured in total.

This is a list alphabetically sorted, and structured after the kind of competition, of the more notable driver deaths, excluding those of motorcycle riders. In addition, several racing drivers have been killed in public road crashes; see List of people who died in road accidents.



Deaths

See also
List of deaths by motorcycle crash
List of people who died in traffic collisions
List of accidents and disasters by death toll for sporting events
List of fatal accidents in motorboat racing
Driver deaths in British motorsport series
List of 24 Hours of Le Mans fatalities

List of NASCAR fatalities
List of IndyCar fatalities
List of Formula One fatalities
List of Dakar Rally fatal accidents
Death of Dale Earnhardt

Notes

References

External links
Database of people that perished in motorsports
A list of all drivers who were killed in racing, testing or practicing at Daytona.
 A list of drivers who perished or were seriously injured in motorsports

 Car
Drivers died in racing crashes
 
motorsport